Karthigai Deepam is a 1965 Indian Tamil-language romantic drama film, directed by A. Kasilingam and produced by P. Markendeyan and A. Kasilingam. The script was written by A. Kasilingam and the comedy parts only were written by Shankar Jai Somu. The film stars S. A. Ashokan, C. Vasantha, K. Vijayan and Leelavathi. It was released on 30 April 1965.

Plot

Cast 
 S. A. Ashokan as Pasubathi
 C. Vasantha as Poornam
 K. Vijayan as Kanaga Sabai
 Leelavathi as Thangam
 S. V. Ramadas as Namachivayam
 G. Sakunthala as Dr. Sathya Bhama
 Sadhan as Venu
 A. Sakunthala as Chandra
 Karikol Raju as Ganapathy
 Master Murali as Murali
 Baby Kala as Kala
 Jayanthi as Mythili
 Thiruchi Kamakshi as Sivakami

Soundtrack 
Music was composed by R. Sudarsanam and lyrics were written by Alangudi Somu.

Reception 
Kalki appreciated the performances of Ashokan and Leelavathi, though the critic felt Ashokan was occasionally overacting.

References

External links 
 

1965 romantic drama films
1960s Tamil-language films
1965 films
Films scored by R. Sudarsanam
Indian black-and-white films
Indian romantic drama films